CMA CGM Air Cargo is the cargo airline division of the CMA CGM shipping group.

History
The company was founded in 2021 and currently has a fleet of four Airbus A330-200Fs and two Boeing 777Fs.  The four Airbus aircraft, initially operated by Air Belgium and based in Liège  are progressively re-registered in France and based 
at Charles-de-Gaule airport in Paris together with the two Boeing aircraft.  The company is also implementing a major expansion plan to double its fleet, both in terms of numbers and capacity.  Specifically, in November 2021 and June 2022, CMA CGM Air Cargo ordered four Airbus A350Fs
and two additional Boeing 777Fs respectively.  

In May 2022, CMA CGM, the airline's parent company signed a strategic partnership with Air France–KLM to develop their air cargo capacities together. As part of the agreement CMA CGM may also acquire a stake of up to 9% in the Franco-Dutch airline group.

Destinations
CMA CGM Air Cargo flies to the following destinations (this table only displays the destinations published in the company's literature and internet site):

Fleet

, the airline operates the following aircraft:

See also
Air cargo
List of airlines of France

References

Airlines of France
Airlines established in 2021
Compagnie Générale Transatlantique